Acraea punctimarginea is a butterfly in the family Nymphalidae. It is found in Tanzania, from the north-eastern part of the country to the Uluguru and Usambara mountains. 
For taxonomy see Pierre & Bernaud, 2014

References

Butterflies described in 1956
punctimarginea
Endemic fauna of Tanzania
Butterflies of Africa